Clarendon was built at Lancaster in 1792 as a West Indiaman. She spent most of her career sailing between England and Jamaica. She then became a transport based out of Hull. She wrecked on 7 April 1815 while bringing prisoners as a cartel from Bermuda to the United States.

Career
Clarendon first appeared in Lloyd's Register (LR) in the volume for 1792.

Fate
On 7 April 1815 she grounded at Sandy Hook but crew, passengers, and prisoners were all saved.

Citations

1792 ships
Ships built in England
Age of Sail merchant ships of England
Maritime incidents in 1815